The Rivers State Housing and Property Development Authority (RSHPDA) is a government agency that has the task of preservation and delivery of affordable housing in Rivers State, Nigeria. It was established under the Housing and Property Development Authority Law No.14 of 1985. Its main goal is to reduce homelessness. It also manages all government-owned housing estates. In December 2013, the agency's general manager and chief executive officer was Iyerefa Cookey-Gam.

Organizational structure
The RSHPDA is governed by a board of directors which is charged with policy, control and management of the Authority. This includes the general manager, secretary to the authority and internal auditor.

Departments and units
There are seven departments under the RSHPDA:
Administrative Department
Estate Department
Projects Department
Research & Planning
Accounts Department
Legal Unit
Audit Unit

See also
List of government agencies of Rivers State

References

External links

Government agencies and parastatals of Rivers State
Housing organizations
Government agencies established in 1985
Housing in Rivers State
1985 establishments in Nigeria